The Mawson Coast is that portion of the coast of Mac. Robertson Land, Antarctica, lying between William Scoresby Bay, at 59°34′E, and Murray Monolith, at 66°54′E. The coast was sighted during the British Australian New Zealand Antarctic Research Expedition (BANZARE), 1929–30, under Sir Douglas Mawson. Further exploration and landings at Cape Bruce and Scullin Monolith were made during BANZARE, 1930–31. Mawson Coast was named by the Antarctic Names Committee of Australia after Mawson in recognition of his great contribution to Antarctic exploration.

It was discovered and named in February 1936 by DI personnel on the William Scoresby.

References

Further reading 
 Ute Christina Herzfeld, Atlas of Antarctica: Topographic Maps from Geostatistical Analysis of Satellite Radar Altimeter Data, PP 86 - 87
 International Symposium on Antarctic Earth, Geological Evolution of Antarctica, Sciences 5th : 1987 : Cambridge, England, PP 25 - 30
 Graham G. Robertson, THE FORAGING ECOLOGY OF EMPEROR PENGUINS (APTENODYTES FORSTERI) AT TWO MAWSON COAST COLONIES, ANTARCTICA, A thesis submitted in fulfilment of the requirements for the degree of Doctor of Philosophy, UNIVERSITY OF TASMANIA, August 1994, PP 25 - 30
  Alan M. Goodwin, Precambrian Geology: The Dynamic Evolution of the Continental Crust, P 449

External links 

 Mawson Coast on AADC website
 Mawson Coast on SCAR website
 Mawson Coast area map
 Mawson Coast on peakbagger.com
 icebergs and sea-ice off the mawson coast on NASA website
 Crustal Heat Production map - Mawson Coast area

Coasts of Antarctica
Landforms of Mac. Robertson Land